A nonsteroidal estrogen is an estrogen with a nonsteroidal chemical structure. The most well-known example is the stilbestrol estrogen diethylstilbestrol (DES). Although nonsteroidal estrogens formerly had an important place in medicine, they have gradually fallen out of favor following the discovery of toxicities associated with high-dose DES starting in the early 1970s, and are now almost never used. On the other hand, virtually all selective estrogen receptor modulators (SERMs) are nonsteroidal, with triphenylethylenes like tamoxifen and clomifene having been derived from DES, and these drugs remain widely used in medicine for the treatment of breast cancer among other indications. In addition to pharmaceutical drugs, many xenoestrogens, including phytoestrogens, mycoestrogens, and synthetic endocrine disruptors like bisphenol A, are nonsteroidal substances with estrogenic activity.

Pharmacology
Nonsteroidal estrogens act as agonists of the estrogen receptors, ERα and ERβ.

List of nonsteroidal estrogens

Synthetic

Pharmaceutical
 Stilbestrols: benzestrol, bifluranol, dienestrol, diethylstilbestrol, dimestrol, fosfestrol, furostilbestrol, hexestrol, mestilbol, methestrol, pentafluranol, phenestrol, terfluranol, stilbestrol esters
 Triphenylethylenes: chlorotrianisene, desmethylchlorotrianisene, estrobin, M2613, triphenylbromoethylene, triphenylchloroethylene, triphenyliodoethylene, triphenylmethylethylene
 Secosteroids (open-ring steroids): allenestrol, allenolic acid, bisdehydrodoisynolic acid, carbestrol, doisynoestrol, doisynolic acid, fenestrel, methallenestril
 Selective ERα or ERβ agonists: diarylpropionitrile, ERB-196, erteberel, FERb 033, GTx-758, prinaberel, propylpyrazoletriol, WAY-166818, WAY-214156
 Others: , paroxypropione, quadrosilan, tetrahydrochrysene

SERMs like tamoxifen and raloxifene can also be considered to be nonsteroidal estrogens in some tissues.

Environmental
 Synthetic xenoestrogens: alkylphenols, bisphenols (e.g., bisphenol A), parabens, phthalates, polyhalogenated compounds

Natural
 Metalloestrogens: cadmium, others
 Mycoestrogens: taleranol (β-zearalanol), α-zearalenol, β-zearalenol, zearalanone, zearalenone, zeranol (α-zearalanol)
 Phytoestrogens: coumestrol, daidzein, deoxymiroestrol, equol, genistein, miroestrol, many others

See also
 Selective estrogen receptor modulator
 Nonsteroidal antiandrogen

References

Further reading
 
 

Estrogens
Sex hormones